Mark Ford may refer to:

Mark Ford (businessman), New Zealand executive, including inaugural chair of Auckland Transport
Mark Ford (cricketer) (born 1961), South African cricketer
Mark Ford (poet) (born 1962), British poet
Mark Ford (footballer) (born 1975), English former association football player
Mark Ford, founder of the British and Irish Meteorite Society
Mark M. Ford, American author, entrepreneur, and publisher
Mark Ford (harness racing) (born 1970), U.S. horse trainer

See also
Marc Ford (born 1966), guitarist with The Black Crowes